The Cuarteto Casals (Casals Quartet) is a Spanish string quartet based at l'Auditori in Barcelona, where all four members reside and teach at the Escola Superior de Musica de Catalunya.

Formation

The Cuarteto Casals was founded at the Reina Sofía School of Music, Madrid, in 1997 under Professor Antonello Farulli. They have studied with Walter Levin and Rainer Schmidt in Barcelona, as well as undertaking graduate work in Cologne under the Alban Berg Quartet and Harald Schoneweg.
The quartet quickly achieved international acclaim when it won first prize at the 2000 London International String Quartet Competition,  and then at the 2002 International Brahms Competition in Hamburg. In recognition of Cuarteto Casals' growing international profile, in 2006 they were honoured with Spain's Premio Nacional de Música (National Music Award). A prize from the prestigious Borletti-Buitoni Trust in London in 2008 enabled the quartet to purchase a matching set of Classical period bows.

The quartet comprises:
Vera Martínez Mehner - Violin.
Abel Tomàs - Violin.
Jonathan Brown - Viola.
Arnau Tomàs - Cello.

Unusually, the role of first and second violin can change from piece to piece during a concert.

Cuarteto Casals has appeared at the Wigmore Hall, Carnegie Hall, Musikverein Vienna, Philharmonie Cologne, Cité de la Musique in Paris, the Schubertiade in Schwarzenberg, Concertgebouw Amsterdam and the Philharmonie in Berlin. Reviewing their two 2012 Wigmore Hall recitals of Schubert's early string quartets, The Independent stated: "one couldn’t have wished for better advocates than the Cuarteto Casals, whose warm, full-toned playing was immaculate and poetic throughout."

The quartet has premiered works by Jordi Cervelló, David del Puerto and Jesús Rueda of Spain, collaborating with James MacMillan of Scotland, and György Kurtág of Hungary, and at the composer's request, has recorded Christian Lauba's quartet, Morphing.

The quartet has accompanied the King of Spain on diplomatic visits and performed on the peerless collection of decorated Stradivarius instruments in the Royal Palace in Madrid.

Cuarteto Casals is currently in residence at the Barcelona conservatory.

The group is named for the well-known 20th-century cellist Pablo Casals.

Discography

The quartet has made recordings for Harmonia Mundi, with repertoire ranging from lesser known Spanish composers Arriaga and Toldrá to Viennese classics Mozart, Haydn and Brahms, through 20th Century greats Bartók, Kurtág and Ligeti.

Reviewing their disc of Schubert's String Quartets D87 & D887, the critic Fiona Maddocks writing in The Observer, said "the excellent Spanish ensemble bring supple radiance and flair to two works which span Schubert's brief career".

Video recordings of Cuarteto Casals' broadcast performances in Spain and Germany are available on YouTube

References

Official website of the Cuarteto Casals

Spanish musical groups
String quartets